CPIP may refer to:

 Carrier Pigeon Internet Protocol, a 2001 implementation of IP over Avian Carriers (IPoAC)
 Canadian Pandemic Influenza Preparedness, a task group developing influenza pandemic plans